The 2021 Abu Dhabi Women's Tennis Open was a women's tennis tournament played on outdoor hard courts. It was the inaugural professional edition of the event and a WTA 500 tournament on the 2021 WTA Tour. It took place at the Zayed Sports City International Tennis Centre in Abu Dhabi, from 6 to 13 January 2021.

Finals

Singles

  Aryna Sabalenka def.  Veronika Kudermetova, 6–2, 6–2

Doubles

  Shuko Aoyama /   Ena Shibahara def.  Hayley Carter /  Luisa Stefani, 7–6(7–5), 6–4

Points and prize money

Point distribution

Prize money

*per team

Singles main-draw entrants

Seeds

1 Rankings are as of December 21, 2020

Other entrants
The following players received entry using a protected ranking into the singles main draw:
  Yaroslava Shvedova
  Zhu Lin

The following player received entry as an alternate:
  Ulrikke Eikeri

The following players received entry from the qualifying draw:
  Kateryna Bondarenko
  Anna Bondár
  Anastasia Gasanova
  Amandine Hesse
  Lucie Hradecká
  Lucrezia Stefanini
  Bianca Turati
  Yang Zhaoxuan

The following players received entry as lucky losers:
  Jodie Burrage
  Valentini Grammatikopoulou
  Despina Papamichail

Withdrawals
Before the tournament
  Amanda Anisimova → replaced by  Ulrikke Eikeri
  Belinda Bencic → replaced by  Vera Zvonareva
  Sorana Cîrstea → replaced by  Despina Papamichail
  Danielle Collins → replaced by  Tamara Zidanšek
  Fiona Ferro → replaced by  Jodie Burrage
  Caroline Garcia → replaced by  Jasmine Paolini
  Svetlana Kuznetsova → replaced by  Wang Xiyu
  Elise Mertens → replaced by  Valentini Grammatikopoulou
  Jeļena Ostapenko → replaced by  Marta Kostyuk
  Kateřina Siniaková → replaced by  Aliaksandra Sasnovich
  Patricia Maria Țig → replaced by  Anastasia Potapova
  Alison Van Uytvanck → replaced by  Jamie Loeb
  Zheng Saisai → replaced by  Leylah Annie Fernandez
During the tournament
  Karolína Muchová

Retirements
  Kirsten Flipkens

Doubles main-draw entrants

Seeds 

 Rankings are as of December 21, 2020

Other entrants
The following pairs received entry into the doubles main draw using a protected ranking:
  Kateryna Bondarenko /  Nadiia Kichenok
  Elena Rybakina /  Yaroslava Shvedova

The following pairs received entry into the doubles main draw as alternates:
  Jasmine Paolini /  Martina Trevisan
  Nadia Podoroska /  Sara Sorribes Tormo

Withdrawals
Before the tournament
  Elise Mertens /  Aryna Sabalenka → replaced by  Nadia Podoroska /  Sara Sorribes Tormo
  Kirsten Flipkens /  Kristina Mladenovic → replaced by  Jasmine Paolini /  Martina Trevisan
During the tournament
  Karolína Muchová /  Markéta Vondroušová

References

External links
 ITF tournament draws

Abu Dhabi Women's Tennis Open
Abu Dhabi Open
2021 in Emirati tennis
Abu Dhabi Women's Tennis Open